Christopher Jacot (born June 30, 1979) is a Canadian film, television and voice actor. He has appeared in 3 seasons of Slasher.

Early life
Jacot was born in Toronto. He attended Earl Haig Secondary School in the Claude Watson programme for drama with fellow actors Sarah Polley and Lani Billard.

Career
Jacot has performed recurring and guest roles on various television series, including Degrassi: The Next Generation, Eureka, Slasher, and The Strain.

Voice work
Jacot has done a great deal of voice work, two of his most notable roles being Johnny Storm, the Human Torch, in the animated series Fantastic Four: World's Greatest Heroes and Maurice Vega in the video game Watch Dogs. He later worked with Ubisoft again in Watch Dogs 2, where he voiced Dus̆an Nemec, the main antagonist, and provided the voice of the character Topher in Total Drama Pahkitew Island.

Filmography

Film

Television

Video games

References

External links
 
 

1979 births
Living people
Canadian male film actors
Canadian male television actors
Canadian male voice actors
Canadian people of Belgian descent
Male actors from Toronto